Alexander Kok (born 24 May 1998) is a South African cricketer. He made his Twenty20 debut for Mpumalanga in the 2019–20 CSA Provincial T20 Cup on 13 September 2019. In April 2021, he was named in Mpumalanga's squad, ahead of the 2021–22 cricket season in South Africa.

References

External links
 

1998 births
Living people
South African cricketers
Mpumalanga cricketers
Place of birth missing (living people)